Bernoy-le-Château is a commune in the department of Aisne in the Hauts-de-France region of northern France. It was established as a commune nouvelle on 1 January 2023 from the merger of the communes of Berzy-le-Sec and Noyant-et-Aconin.

See also 
 Communes of the Aisne department

References 

Communes of Aisne
Communes nouvelles of Aisne
Populated places established in 2023
2023 establishments in France